Nasrin Dousti (also Romanized as "Nasrīn Dūstī"; born 19 December 1988) is an Iranian karateka, who competes in the kumite -50 kg division. She won a gold medal at the 2012 Asian Karate Championships and a bronze at the 2014 Asian Games. Her sister Delaram is also an international karate competitor.

References

Living people
Iranian female karateka
1988 births
Asian Games medalists in karate
Asian Games bronze medalists for Iran
Karateka at the 2014 Asian Games
Medalists at the 2014 Asian Games
Islamic Solidarity Games medalists in karate
21st-century Iranian women
Islamic Solidarity Games competitors for Iran